The 2002 Big South Conference baseball tournament  was the postseason baseball tournament for the Big South Conference, held from May 22 through 26 at Winthrop Ballpark, home field of Winthrop in Rock Hill, South Carolina.  All eight eligible teams participated in the double-elimination tournament. The champion, won the title for the fifth time, and second in a row, and earned an invitation to the 2002 NCAA Division I baseball tournament.

Format
All teams qualified for the tournament.  The teams were seeded one through eight based on conference winning percentage and played a double-elimination tournament.  Birmingham–Southern was not eligible for championships as they completed their transition from NCAA Division II.

Bracket and results

All-Tournament Team

Most Valuable Player
Adam Keim was named Tournament Most Valuable Player.  Keim was a shortstop for Coastal Carolina.

References

Tournament
Big South Conference Baseball Tournament
Big South baseball tournament
Big South Conference baseball tournament